Gastro-omental artery may refer to:

 Left gastro-omental artery
 Right gastro-omental artery